Grombalia is a Tunisian city located in the Nabeul Governorate. Its population was 24,336 (2014 Census), while the population of the municipality was 67,475. It is the birthplace of former president Moncef Marzouki.

Grombalia has two sister cities. Fort Smith, Arkansas, United States and Cisterna, Italy.

Grombalia is also known for grape farming,that's why they have a grape vine statue as a city center

References

Populated places in Tunisia
Communes of Tunisia